Zulfi Hajiyev Saleh oglu (1935 – 1991) was Member of Azerbaijani Parliament and Deputy Prime Minister of Azerbaijan until his death on 20 November 1991.

Early years
Hajiyev was born in Böyük Mazra village of Armenia in 1935. Until 1989, he has worked as the Chairman Executive Committee of Sumgayit, Chairman of Sumgayit Party Committee, Chairman of Cabinet of Ministers of Nakhchivan ASSR. In 1976, he was elected a deputy to the Supreme Soviet of Azerbaijan SSR, to remain a member of parliament until his death. In 1989, Hajiyev was appointed Deputy Prime Minister of Azerbaijan. During his term in office, he was also given responsibilities to preside over matters of Nagorno-Karabakh.

Death
Hajiyev was killed in a helicopter which was accidentally shot down by Armenian forces on 20 November 1991 near the Karakend village of Khojavend district in Nagorno-Karabakh, Azerbaijan along with other high-ranking officials from Azerbaijan, Russia and Kazakhstan. There were no survivors of the crash. Hajiyev was buried at the Honorary Cemetery in Baku.

Awards
For his work and contributions, Hajiyev had been awarded with Order of the Red Banner of Labour, Order of Friendship of Peoples, Order of the Badge of Honour. He was also given a title of Merited Engineer of Republic of Azerbaijan. One of the main streets, a company he had worked for in the past and one of fifteen schools he had built in Sumgayit, and an Azerbaijani oil exploration ship were given his name.

See also
1991 Azerbaijani Mil Mi-8 shootdown
Azerbaijanis in Armenia

References

Armenian Azerbaijanis
1935 births
1991 deaths
Political office-holders in Azerbaijan
Government ministers of Azerbaijan
National Heroes of Azerbaijan
Recipients of the Order of Friendship of Peoples
Recipients of the Order of the Red Banner of Labour
Azerbaijani people of the Nagorno-Karabakh War
Victims of aircraft shootdowns
People from Gegharkunik Province